Abdullah Fareed Al Hafith (born 25 December 1992) is a Saudi Arabian footballer, who plays as a defender for Saudi Pro League team Al-Wehda.

Personal life
Abdullah is the brother of the player Ibrahim Al-Hafith.

Club career
He started his career with Al-Ittifaq in the Saudi Professional League. He joined Portuguese club Leiria in 2011. After the club was relegated in 2012, he joined Paços Ferreira.

Al-Hilal
In 2013, Abdullah joined Al-Hilal. On 10 August 2017, Abdulla scored his first goal for Al-Hilal against Al-Fayha. On 8 January 2018, Abdullah scored his second goal against his former club Ettifaq in stoppage time of the first half, but Al-Hilal drew 1–1 in that match.

Al-Ittihad
On 18 August 2021, Al-Hafith joined Al-Ittihad on loan until the end of the 2021–22 season.

Career statistics

Club

Honours

Club

Al-Hilal
 Saudi Professional League: 2016–17, 2017–18, 2019–20
 King Cup: 2015, 2017
 Saudi Super Cup: 2015, 2018
 AFC Champions League: 2019

References

External links
 

1992 births
Living people
People from Dammam
Association football defenders
Saudi Arabian footballers
Saudi Arabia youth international footballers
Ettifaq FC players
U.D. Leiria players
F.C. Paços de Ferreira players
Al Hilal SFC players
Hajer FC players
Al-Wehda Club (Mecca) players
Ittihad FC players
Saudi Professional League players
Primeira Liga players
Expatriate footballers in Portugal
Saudi Arabian expatriate footballers
Saudi Arabian expatriate sportspeople in Portugal
Footballers at the 2014 Asian Games
Asian Games competitors for Saudi Arabia
20th-century Saudi Arabian people
21st-century Saudi Arabian people